Nigishtan is a village in the municipality of Ǵorče Petrov, North Macedonia.

Demographics
As of the 2021 census, Nikištane had 1,127 residents with the following ethnic composition:
Albanians 1,084
Persons for whom data are taken from administrative sources 43

According to the 2002 census, the village had a total of 1114 inhabitants. Ethnic groups in the village include:
Albanians 1113
Others 1

References

External links

Villages in Ǵorče Petrov Municipality
Albanian communities in North Macedonia